Mediophycis is a monotypic snout moth genus described by Rolf-Ulrich Roesler in 1982. Its only species, Mediophycis attavella, was described by Pierre Viette in 1964. It is found in Madagascar.

References

Moths described in 1964
Phycitinae
Monotypic moth genera
Moths of Madagascar